Læsø Airport  (internationally also called Laeso Airport) is located on the island of Læsø, in the North Denmark Region of Denmark.

Airlines and destinations
The following airlines operate regular scheduled and charter flights at the airport:

Ground transport
Taxis serve the whole Island. There are no scheduled bus services operating from the airport.

See also
 List of the largest airports in the Nordic countries

References

External links

Airports in Denmark
Buildings and structures in the North Jutland Region
Transport in the North Jutland Region